Quindío is a department of Colombia. It is in the western central region of the country, crossed by the Andes mountains. Its capital is Armenia. It is famous for the quality of the coffee plantations, colorful architecture, benign weather, variety of hotel accommodations and tourist landmarks. This department is located in a strategic area, in the center of the triangle formed by the three main cities of the country: Bogotá, Medellín and Cali.  Quindío is the second-smallest Colombian department (0.2% of the national territory) with 12 municipalities. Ethnographically and culturally, it belongs to the Paisa region.

History 

Before the Spanish invasion the entire area was inhabited by the peoples of the Quimbaya civilization until the 10th century B.C. At the time of Spanish conquest the area was inhabited by indigenous people of Carib descent known as the Pijao tribes. The native population was gradually reduced due to slavery, armed confrontations, and massacres during the Rubber boom, causing the territory to remain mostly uninhabited over the following centuries.  At the present time, only a small population of nearly 2000 Amerindians remains in an indigenous reservation near La Tebaida.

The first settlement to be founded in the area was Salento in 1842. In the 19th century northern peasants from Antioquia set out to settle in the area and their goal was to stay there permanently in a process known as Colonización antioqueña (Antioquian Colonisation). Due to the inaccessibility of the territory and the lack of roads, trade and communications were made through mule caravans (arriería) or by porters such as the silleros. 

In 1905, the old Department of Antioquia was partitioned into two, giving rise to the new Department of Caldas, which at the time included the modern department of Risaralda. In 1908 Quindio territory, then in jurisdiction of the Cauca Department, was annexed to Caldas department.

Also, see list of Governors of the Department of Quindío.

Municipalities 
In order of population:
Armenia, capital city. Named after the Caucasus republic of Armenia.
Calarcá. Named after Cacique (Chief) Calarca of the Pijao people.
La Tebaida. Named after the Thebaid region of ancient Egypt.
Circasia. Named after the Caucasus region of Circassia.
Montenegro. Named after the Balkan republic of Montenegro.
Quimbaya. Named after the indigenous Quimbaya civilization.
Salento. Named after the Salento region in Italy.
Córdoba. Named after the Andalusian city of Córdoba, Spain.
Pijao. Named after the Amerindian Pijao federation.
Génova. Named after the Italian city of Genoa.
Buenavista. Named after the Spanish city of Buenavista de Valdavia.
Filandia. Named from the Latin words "filia" (daughter) and "Andia" (Andes), thus "daughter of the Andes" (the northernmost municipality of the department).

Geography 

Most of its surface is occupied for the western face of the Cordillera Central.

This department consists entirely of mountain landscapes covered in tropical rainforest and Guadua bamboo forests. The ground is enriched with ancient volcanic eruptions, raising its fertility. There are also many rivers and streams, including the Quindío River which rises in the Cocora Valley.

The weather varies widely, having two rainy seasons (April and November) separated by two dry seasons.

Quindío wax palm tree 

With law 61 of 1985, the Colombian Congress adopted the Quindío wax palm tree, Ceroxylon quindiuense, a local endangered species adapted to high altitudes, as the National Tree. As ratified on September 16, 1985, by the then president of Colombia, Belisario Betancur, the law states: "The species commonly known as the Quindío wax palm tree, scientific name Ceroxylon quindiuense, is declared the national tree and symbol of our fatherland.  The national government is empowered to buy as much land as needed to create wildlife sanctuaries with the purpose of preserving this national symbol and its natural environment. It is forbidden to cut down the Quindío wax palm tree. The punishment for doing so shall be a fine and a term in jail"."

The Quindío wax palm tree was nearly driven to extinction by the extraction of the resinous substance that it exudes. Furthermore, its leaves were widely used for the celebration of Holy Week processions, especially that of Palm Sunday.

Economy 
Quindío's economy is based mainly in the harvest of coffee. It is one of the most important producers of Colombian coffee. The department belongs to the Colombian Coffee-Growers Axis which is the center of production and export of the highest quality coffee in Colombia.  Plantain, cassava, Salentune potato and sugarcane are also cultivated, mostly for sale in local markets.

Tourism 

 Quimbaya museum
 Colombian National Coffee Park
 PANACA park
 Cocora Valley
 El Mariposario (Butterfly vivarium)
 National Bamboo and Guadua Investigation Center
 Peñas Blancas
 Nevado del Quindío

Culture

Gastronomy

Some of the typical food and drinks are:

 Salentune Patacón, which is made with plantain, smashed in a thin layer, fried and covered with grounded cheese and pineapple sauce
 Quindian arepa filled with shredded chicken and pieces of pig chicharrón
 Cocora, which is a baked trout
 Maduro, which is a broiled plantain filled with cheese and Bocadillo (thick guava jam)
 Roasted gurre
 Guatin stew
 Coffee wine (obtained from fermentation of coffee berries) with flavor similar to coffee liqueur
 Coffee arequipe
 Corn chicha fermented in a large pottery recipient containing a horseshoe to enhance the flavor
 Carajillo, a typical cocktail made of one part of hot coffee, one part of sugarcane aguardiente and cinnamon sticks

Festivals and celebrations

Quindío department is the main exponent of traditional Cultura Cafetera (coffee culture) in the country. There are several events all around the year that attracts a large number of visitors to this region. With the purpose of preserving this cultural expression, the regional government promotes the declaration of Patrimony of Humanity by the UNESCO.

Among other events:

The National Coffee Party is the main event of the department. It is celebrated each year since 1960 in Calarcá, the last days of June. The event includes the national beauty contest of coffee.
The international fair of handcrafts, each may in Armenia.
The day of St. Isidro (July-all the municipalities).
The National festival of kites (August- La Tebaida).
The anniversary of Armenia (October), with the Yipao or jeep parade.
The candlelight festival of Quimbaya (December) .
The Bullfighting season of La Macarena (January- Armenia).

The Quimbayan Christmas Panther
The Quimbayan Christmas Panther is an indigenous & sacred animal recognized by indigenous and mestizo communities in the Quindío Department of Colombia. Belief in the Christmas Panther (el puma de navidad) has developed throughout the history of the Quimbayan holiday known as the Alumbrado de Navidad (see Feast of the Immaculate Conception), celebrated on the 7th of December in recognition of the Roman Catholic belief in the Immaculate Conception of Christ. It is believed that the significance of the puma stems from the arrival of ethnically Spanish colonialists from Antioquia in the region during the 1850s. The colonialist's Catholic traditions of using candlelight to celebrate the Immaculate Conception was combined with belief of the local Quimbaya tribe in the effect that fire (luces de fogota) had in protecting against panther attacks as pumas and other local fauna are believed to fear fire. Thus, in an instance of religious syncretism, the Alumbrado de Navidad and the symbolism of the puma to native peoples were linked. It is still a common practice to display the symbol of the panther (in the form of sculptures made of terra cotta, cloth, plastic, etc.) in conjunction with the lighting of candles on the night of December the 7th. Such religious syncretism is especially visible in the rural pueblos of Quindío where many residents claim full or partial descent from Quimbaya native peoples of the region.(the Quimbayan christmas panther is blue with yellow tail).

Fauna and Flora 

Quindío is the natural habitat of 520 species of birds and about 60 species of mammals. Many of them are endemisms. The area has the largest number of Heliconia species in the world and a large numbers of species of orchids, mainly of the genera Cattleya, Odontoglossum, Miltonia, Phragmipedium and Peristeria.  The natural forests typical of the area, such as the páramo, and the cloud forest, are decreasing progressively due to agricultural activities.  As a result, many of the endemic species are threatened, endangered or critically endangered. Some of them are:  
 Yellow-eared parrot
 Andean guan
 Colombian weasel
 Epicrionops columbianus caecilian
 Mano de Oso tree.

References

External links

 Biblioteca Luis Ángel Arango/Quindío

 
Departments of Colombia
States and territories established in 1966